The Motherbank is a shallow sandbar off the northeast coast of the Isle of Wight in England. It lies in the Solent between Cowes and Ryde.

The Motherbank is located near historically significant ports and anchorages such as Portsmouth, Spithead, Southampton, and St. Helen's Bay, and has long served as an important anchorage itself. Merchant ships have anchored at the Motherbank for centuries.

The Royal Navy for many years anchored old, decommissioned warships at the Motherbank while they awaited disposal. An old warship might be anchored there for anything between several weeks and several years before being sold, scrapped or sunk as a target.

Notes

References
Old Towns of England: Portsmouth

Shoals of the United Kingdom
Landforms of the Isle of Wight